The Loop is an American sitcom that ran from March 15, 2006 to July 1, 2007 on Fox. The show starred Bret Harrison as Sam Sullivan, a young professional trying to balance the needs of his social life with the pressures of working at the corporate headquarters of TransAlliance Airways, a major U.S. airline. Chicago's downtown loop area was the setting for most of the show. The show's theme song is "Hockey Monkey" by James Kochalka Superstar and the Zambonis.

Premise
The Loop focuses on the life of its main character, Sam Sullivan (Bret Harrison). The show is shot with a single-camera setup instead of a multiple-camera setup more typical for situation comedies. The series follows Sam, his friends, and his co-workers as they try to survive both their personal and professional lives. A complete script is written for each episode but actors are also given opportunities to improvise their lines during the shooting process.

Cast and characters

 Bret Harrison as Sam "Thesis" Sullivan: A young professional trying to balance the needs of his social life with the pressures of working at the corporate headquarters of TransAlliance Airways.
 Philip Baker Hall as Russ McDonald: Head executive of TransAlliance Airways and one of Sam's bosses. He's lived a wild life in aviation, from Air Force pilot to head of the company, which occasionally comes back to haunt him.
 Eric Christian Olsen as Sully Sullivan: Sam's goofy, carefree and jobless older brother and roommate.
 Amanda Loncar as Piper (season 1): One of Sam's friends, whom he has had a crush on since they met freshman year of college. She is also his roommate. In the first season. she was studying to become a doctor.
 Sarah Mason as Lizzy (season 1): One of Sam's friends and roommate. Her job in the first season was a bartender.
 Mimi Rogers as Meryl: Sexually adventurous, she is an executive at TransAlliance Airways, and one of Sam's bosses.
 Joy Osmanski as Darcy: Sam's personal assistant and former student at MIT. She frequently laments that most of her classmates are in space, suggesting she couldn't get security clearance, because a colorful past, which she's hiding from.
 Ian Reed Kesler as Derek Rene Tricolli: An obnoxious businessman for Goldman Sachs, who works in the same building and constantly gets under Sam's skin. In the second season, it's suggested that he's omnisexual. In an episode of the second season, he makes a deal to trade business contacts with Sam, for a night of passion with Darcy; and she readily agrees to him pimping her out.
 Howard Miller as DeKeyser: Executive of TransAlliance Airways
 Michael D. Roberts as Hibbert: Executive of TransAlliance Airways

Development and production
The Loop lasted only two seasons. Season 1 was 7 episodes. The show was renewed for a second season consisting of 13 episodes on May 12 by Fox. It was one of only two live-action sitcoms renewed for the 2006-2007 season on Fox, along with The War at Home. The Loop'''s second season took place mainly in the workplace, and less of it with Sam's friends. The producers stated they "found most of the comedy to be with Sam and his co-workers and they wanted to expand on that." On November 28, 2006, it was announced that the show's second season episode order had been reduced from thirteen to ten, with Fox's crowded spring schedule believed to be the main reason for the reduction. The show was cancelled on May 17, 2007, before the second season was even broadcast. Fox eventually burned off the remaining episodes on Sundays beginning June 10, 2007.

Episodes

Season 1: 2006

Season 2: 2007

U.S. television ratings
Below is a table of the seasonal rankings (based on average total viewers per episode) of The Loop on Fox.

 Note: Each U.S. network television season starts in late September and ends in late May, which coincides with the completion of May sweeps.Home media
The first season of The Loop'' was released on DVD on March 6, 2007. Bonus features included a featurette with interviews from the cast and crew.

International airdates

References

External links

 

2006 American television series debuts
2007 American television series endings
2000s American single-camera sitcoms
2000s American workplace comedy television series
Aviation television series
Fox Broadcasting Company original programming
Television series by 20th Century Fox Television
Television series created by Pam Brady
Television shows set in Chicago